Here They Come is a World War I song in the style of a march written and composed by Arthur Bergh. It was published in 1917 by Jos. W. Stern & Co. in New York, NY. The sheet music cover, illustrated by Starmer, has a large photo of troops parading down a city street.

The sheet music can be found at the Pritzker Military Museum & Library.

References 

Bibliography
Parker, Bernard S. World War I Sheet Music 1. Jefferson: McFarland & Company, Inc., 2007. . 

1917 songs
Songs of World War I